Kara-Jygach is a village in Batken Region of Kyrgyzstan. It is part of the Kadamjay District. Its population was 3,152 in 2021. Nearby towns and villages include Kara-Kyshtak and Chauvay.

References

External links 

Satellite map at Maplandia.com

Populated places in Batken Region